Billiluna may refer to:

 Billiluna (Mindibungu), Indigenous Australian community in the Kimberley region of Western Australia
 Billiluna Station, cattle station in the Kimberley region of Western Australia